Charles John Wiedemeyer (January 31, 1914 – October 27, 1979) nicknamed "Chick", was a Major League Baseball pitcher who played for one season. He pitched for the Chicago Cubs in four games during the 1934 Chicago Cubs season.

External links

1914 births
1979 deaths
Major League Baseball pitchers
Chicago Cubs players
Baseball players from Chicago